The 41st Virginia Cavalry Battalion was a Confederate States Army cavalry battalion during the American Civil War. It was formed in September 1863, initially with four companies and later increased to seven. It fought in western Virginia and the Shenandoah Valley. In April 1864 it was merged with another cavalry battalion to form the 23rd Virginia Cavalry.

See also
List of Virginia Civil War units

Sources
 41st Virginia Cavalry Battalion

Units and formations of the Confederate States Army from Virginia
1863 establishments in Virginia
Military units and formations established in 1863
1865 disestablishments in Virginia
Military units and formations disestablished in 1865